Benzylacetone (IUPAC name: 4-phenylbutan-2-one) is a liquid with a sweet, flowery smell that is considered to be the most abundant attractant compound in flowers (e.g. Coyote Tobacco, Nicotiana attenuata) and one of volatile components of cocoa.

It can be used as an attractant for melon flies (Bactrocera cucurbitae), in perfume, and as an odorant for soap.

It can be prepared by the hydrogenation of benzylideneacetone.

See also
 Odor
 Pheromone
 Fragrances

References

External links
 Fluka 4-Phenyl-2-butanone
 NIST 4-Phenyl-2-butanone

Ketones
Flavors
Perfume ingredients
Phenyl compounds
Benzyl compounds
Sweet-smelling chemicals